O. Wayne Steeves (born December 12, 1944) is a politician in the province of New Brunswick, Canada.

Steeves was born in Lower Coverdale, New Brunswick, the son of Noel Steeves and Vera Downing. A Progressive Conservative, he has been a candidate for the Legislative Assembly of New Brunswick for the electoral district of Albert in every election since 1991. Defeated in 1991 and 1995, Steeves was finally elected in 1999.

He was re-elected in 2003 and joined the cabinet as minister of public safety.  He was again re-elected in 2006 but left the cabinet as his party formed the opposition.

He retained the seat until the 2014 New Brunswick general election, when he did not run for re-election and was succeeded by Brian Keirstead.

References 
 MLA Bios, Government of New Brunswick

1944 births
Living people
Members of the Executive Council of New Brunswick
Progressive Conservative Party of New Brunswick MLAs
People from Albert County, New Brunswick
21st-century Canadian politicians